RNA 3'-terminal phosphate cyclase-like protein is an enzyme that in humans is encoded by the RCL1 gene.

Copy number variants to the RCL1 gene are associated with a range of neuropsychiatric phenotypes, and a missense variant associated with depression.

See also 

 Fibrillarin
 Small nucleolar RNA U3
 RRP9
 UTP6
 UTP11L
 UTP14A
 UTP15

References

Further reading

External links